Mount Rumney is a semi-rural locality in the local government area (LGA) of Clarence in the Hobart LGA region of Tasmania. The 2016 census has a population of 267 for the state suburb of Mount Rumney.
It is a suburb of Hobart.

The suburb is based on the slopes of the mountain, Mount Rumney, part of the Meehan Range.

History 
Mount Rumney was gazetted as a locality in 1999.

Geography
Mount Rumney (the mountain) is contained within the locality.

References

Localities of City of Clarence
Towns in Tasmania